The Stevens–Coolidge House and Gardens, formerly known as Ashdale Farm, is a garden and historic home located on  at 153 Chickering Road in North Andover, Massachusetts. Helen Stevens Coolidge's family first acquired the farm in 1729, and from 1914 to 1962 it was her summer home with husband John Gardner Coolidge, diplomat, descendant of Thomas Jefferson, and nephew of Isabella Stewart Gardner. It is now a nonprofit museum operated by The Trustees of Reservations.

Between 1914 and 1918, architect Joseph Everett Chandler remodeled two late-Federal period farmhouses to form today's house. Chandler also enhanced the design of the landscape, which eventually included a perennial garden, a kitchen and flower garden, and a rose garden (all in the Colonial Revival style). A potager garden (kitchen garden in the French style) with a brick serpentine wall and a greenhouse complex were also built. The house's collections include Asian artifacts including Chinese porcelain, American furniture, and European decorative arts.

In 2020, a project began to restore the murals in the house.

References

Bibliography
Forsyth, Holly Kerr. Gardens of Eden: Among the World's Most Beautiful Gardens. Carlton, Vic.: Miegunyah Press, 2009.

External links
Stevens–Coolidge Place The Trustees of Reservations
Property map
House and Garden FAQs

North Andover, Massachusetts
The Trustees of Reservations
Historic house museums in Massachusetts
Museums in Essex County, Massachusetts
Houses in North Andover, Massachusetts
Gardens in Massachusetts
Parks in Essex County, Massachusetts